The 2012 South Africa Sevens was the ninth edition of the tournament and the third tournament of the 2012–13 IRB Sevens World Series.

New Zealand defeated France 47–12 in the final. Because of this, they (that is, New Zealand) won the title of champion of the 2012 South Africa Sevens.

Format
The teams were divided into pools of four teams, who played a round-robin within the pool. Points were awarded in each pool on a different schedule from most rugby tournaments—3 for a win, 2 for a draw, 1 for a loss.
The top two teams in each pool advanced to the Cup competition. The four quarterfinal losers dropped into the bracket for the Plate. The Bowl was contested by the third- and fourth-place finishers in each pool, with the losers in the Bowl quarterfinals dropping into the bracket for the Shield.

Teams
The participating teams are:

Pool stage
The draw was made on December 2.

Pool A

Pool B

Pool C

Pool D

Knockout stage

Shield

Bowl

Plate

Cup

References

External links

South Africa Sevens
South Africa Sevens
South Africa Sevens